Raju Tamang (born 27 October 1985) is a footballer from Nepal. He currently plays for departmental team Nepal Army Club in Martyr's Memorial A-Division League.

International
He made his first appearance for the Nepal national football team in 2005. During the 2014 AFC Challenge Cup qualification Tamand converted a Penalty kick for Nepal in a 6-0 rout over Northern Mariana Islands national football team after teammate Jagajeet Shrestha was fouled in the box.

International Goals

Personal life
In late August 2011 Tamang was called up by the Nepalese Army to take part in the UN mission in Haiti. Tamang spent six months taking part in the international response to the 2010 Haiti earthquake. Nepal Army Club coach Damber Singh Gurung said that "We will miss him in the league. His role in our team is very important. But it is a system in Nepal Army that every Army [soldier] gets this opportunity to take part in UN Mission." In addition to missing many league games with his club Tamang also missed the FIFA World Cup Qualifier matches against Timor-Leste.

Controversy
In March 2012 the Nepal Army Club would not allow Tamang and teammate Bikash Malla to take part in the 2012 AFC Challenge Cup on home soil, as the two were to take part in the Southeast Asian army games also hosted by Nepal. Tamang and Malla were forced to leave the Nepalese team in mid-training, infuriating then coach Graham Roberts.

Awards
ANFA Player of the year's 2016.

References 

1985 births
Living people
Nepalese footballers
Nepal international footballers
Association football midfielders